Wellington Central is an electorate, represented by a Member of Parliament in the New Zealand House of Representatives. Its MP since November 2008 has been Labour Party's Grant Robertson. In the 2020 election he was opposed by James Shaw (Greens) and Nicola Willis (National), both also entered parliament via their respective party lists.

Population centres

As of 1999 Wellington Central covered the central city and its immediate suburban periphery, stretching from Karori, Wilton and Wadestown in the west, to the summit of Mount Victoria in the east, and southwards to a boundary with the Rongotai electorate near Wellington Hospital. Prior to the 1999 election, its boundaries extended further north to include the affluent suburbs of Ngaio and Khandallah.

Wellington Central has one of the most affluent and well-educated constituencies in New Zealand. It is home to many government agencies, as well as to the New Zealand Parliament Buildings and to two universities.

Following the 2014 boundary review, Wellington Central lost the suburb of Wadestown to the Ōhāriu electorate.

History
Wellington Central was established in 1905 when the multi-member urban electorate City of Wellington was replaced by three new seats: Wellington East, Wellington North and Wellington Central. A prominent holder of the seat was Labour Party leader Peter Fraser, who was Prime Minister from 1940 to 1949. Wellington Central was nominally abolished in 1993, when a redistribution moved its boundary west, resulting in the new name of Wellington-Karori. Pauline Gardiner won the Wellington-Karori seat in 1993. Three years later, a new, larger Wellington Central was created as one of the 65 original MMP constituencies in time for the 1996 election.

The first elected MMP representative was ACT Party leader Richard Prebble, controversially elected in 1996 after National Party leader Jim Bolger indicated that National voters should give their electorate vote to Prebble, rather than to National candidate Mark Thomas, in order for ACT to get into parliament. Prebble would eventually become the third representative from Wellington Central in three elections to face defeat after a single term in office. Labour's Marian Hobbs held the seat from 1999, when she defeated Prebble, until 2008, when she retired. Grant Robertson retained Labour's hold on the seat in 2008 and has held the seat since.

A documentary, Campaign, directed by Tony Sutorius, highlighted the events surrounding the 1996 campaign in the electorate.

Members of Parliament
Key

List MPs
Members of Parliament elected from party lists in elections where that person also unsuccessfully contested the Wellington Central electorate. Unless otherwise stated, all MPs terms began and ended at general elections.

1Foster-Bell was elected from the party list in May 2013 following the resignation of Jackie Blue.
2Willis was elected from the party list in April 2018 following the resignation of Steven Joyce.

Election results

2020 election

2017 election

2014 election

2011 election

Electorate (as at 26 November 2011): 48,316

2008 election

2005 election

1999 election
The National party did not stand a candidate in this election because of the events of the 1996 Wellington Central election where then leader Prime Minister Jim Bolger withdrew support for National’s candidate Mark Thomas just before the election in preference for Act leader Richard Prebble.

The absence of a National candidate in this election did not help Richard Prebble and he lost the seat to new Labour candidate Marian Hobbs.

1996 election
The 1996 election, the first under the new electoral system MMP, saw ACT candidate and former Labour Cabinet Minister Richard Prebble compete against former National Party Wellington-Karori MP Pauline Gardiner now standing for United New Zealand, the National party candidate Mark Thomas, Labour's Alick Shaw and Danna Glendining for the Alliance.

The election campaign saw Prime Minister Jim Bolger endorse Richard Prebble shortly before the election in preference to Thomas. The events were captured in the movie Campaign. The electorate was won by Richard Prebble.

1992 by-election

1990 election

1987 election

1984 election

1981 election

1978 election

1975 election

1972 election

1969 election

1966 election

1963 election

1960 election

1957 election

1954 election

1951 election

1949 election

1946 election

 
 
 
 
 
 

Table footnotes:

1943 election

1938 election

1935 election

1931 election

1928 election

1925 election

1922 election

1919 election

1918 by-election

1914 election

|}

1911 election

First ballot

 

|}

Second ballot

|}

1905 election

Table footnotes

Notes

References

External links
Electorate Profile  Parliamentary Library
 Election results for Wellington Central at the 2014 election Elections New Zealand

New Zealand electorates
Politics of the Wellington Region
1905 establishments in New Zealand
1993 disestablishments in New Zealand
1996 establishments in New Zealand